Chrysostomos Sandramanis (born April 5, 2000) is a Greek professional basketball player for Chania of the Greek 3rd division. He is 1.96 m (6'5") tall, and he plays at the point guard and shooting guard positions.

Professional career
Sandramanis began his pro career in 2016, during the 2015–16 season, with Promitheas Patras, in the Greek 2nd Division. In the 2017–18 season, he made his debut in Greece's top-tier level, the Greek Basket League. In the 2018–19 season, he played in a European-wide league for the first time, as he debuted in one of the two European secondary leagues, the FIBA Champions League. After a brief try-out period with Ionikos Nikaias, Sandramanis signed with Karditsa on September 23, 2019. In December of the same year, he moved back to the Greek 1st division, joining Aris Thessaloniki. On August 19, 2020, he signed with Chania.

National team career
Sandramanis has been a member of the junior national teams of Greece. With Greece's junior national teams, he played at the 2016 FIBA Under-16 European Championship, the 2018 FIBA Under-18 European Championship, and at the 2019 FIBA Under-19 World Cup.

References

External links
EuroCup Profile
FIBA Profile
FIBA Champions League Profile 
Basketball-Reference.com Profile
Eurobasket.com Profile
RealGM.com Profile
Greek Basket League Profile 
Greek Basket League Profile 
Promitheas Profile 

2000 births
Living people
Greek Basket League players
Greek men's basketball players
Point guards
Aris B.C. players
Promitheas Patras B.C. players
Shooting guards
Sportspeople from Alexandroupolis